Zygmunt Michał Vetulani (1894–1942) was a Polish diplomat and economist. He was a general consul of Rzeczpospolita in Kaliningrad, Baghdad and Rio de Janeiro.

Biography 
He was the oldest son of Roman Vetulani and Elżbieta Kunachowicz. His brothers were Kazimierz, Tadeusz and Adam. He also had two sisters: Maria and Elżbieta. In 1912 he graduated Queen Sophia high school in Sanok.

He was married to Stanisława Leśniewska. They had a daughter, Wanda.

Family tree

References 

Polish diplomats
Polish economists
1894 births
1942 deaths
People from Sanok
Polish expatriates in Brazil
Polish expatriates in Iraq